On January 28, 1948, a DC-3 plane carrying 32 persons, mostly Mexican farm laborers, including some from the bracero guest worker program, crashed in the Diablo Range, 20 miles west of Coalinga, California. The crash, which killed everyone aboard the plane, inspired the song "Deportee" by Woody Guthrie.

Some of the passengers were being returned to Mexico at the termination of their bracero contracts, while others were illegal immigrants being deported. Initial news reports listed only the pilot, first officer, and stewardess, with the remainder listed only as "deportees." Only 12 of the victims were initially identified. The Mexican victims of the accident were placed in a mass grave at Holy Cross Cemetery in Fresno, California, with their grave marked only as "Mexican Nationals".

Accident
The Douglas DC-3 aircraft, owned by Airline Transport Carriers of Burbank, California, was chartered by the Immigration and Naturalization Service to fly twenty-eight Mexican citizens, who were being deported to the INS Deportation Center in El Centro, California.

For reasons never explained, pilot Frank Atkinson and co-pilot Marion Ewing took a DC-3 that had seats for only twenty-six passengers (seven hours overdue for a routine and required safety inspection) for the flight, instead of an aircraft certified to carry thirty-two passengers. Arriving in Oakland, California, after a routine flight, the crew was joined by INS guard Frank Chaffin. The flight was to refuel at Burbank, California, before continuing to El Centro.

The port wing suddenly ripped off, spilling nine passengers out of the gaping hole in the fuselage. The aircraft caught fire and spiralled to the ground near Los Gatos Creek, exploding in a ball of fire. The investigation by the Civil Aeronautics Authority discovered that a fuel leak in the port engine's fuel pump had ignited and the slipstream fanned the flames to a white hot intensity. The ensuing fire, acting like an oxy-acetylene torch, burned through the wingspar and caused the crash.

Initial news reports listed only the pilot, first officer, stewardess, and the immigration guard, with the remainder listed only as "deportees". Only 12 of the victims were initially identified. The Hispanic victims of the accident were placed in a mass grave at Holy Cross Cemetery in Fresno, California, with their grave marked only as "Mexican Nationals".

Woody Guthrie song, "Deportee"

Singer-songwriter Woody Guthrie wrote a poem in 1948 lamenting the anonymity of the workers killed in the crash, identified only as "deportees" in media reports. When Guthrie's poem was set to music a decade later by college student Martin Hoffman, it became the folk song "Deportee (Plane Wreck at Los Gatos)".

The song was popularized by Pete Seeger, and was subsequently performed by Arlo Guthrie Joan Baez, Judy Collins, Julie Felix, Cisco Houston, Willie Nelson, Dolly Parton, Johnny Cash, Bruce Springsteen, Paul Kelly, Martyn Joseph, The Byrds, Richard Shindell and Ani DiFranco among others.

Aftermath
Cesar Chavez, later to become founder of the United Farm Workers union, learned of the tragic crash while serving in the US Navy, helping convince him that farm workers should be treated "as important human beings and not as agricultural implements".

The names of all the victims were published in local papers in 1948. In 2009, writer Tim Z. Hernandez began to seek out the gravesite and those names. With the help of others, by July 2013 all had been identified (some of the names were misspelled in the records), and the money raised for a more fitting memorial. On September 2, 2013 (Labor Day), a Deportee Memorial Headstone was unveiled at a mass in the Holy Cross Cemetery in Fresno attended by more than 600. The memorial includes all twenty-eight names of the migrant workers, which included three women, and one man born in Spain, not Mexico as widely reported.

References

External links

Report - Civil Aeronautics Board - PDF
Jason Daley: One Man's Search to Find the Families of the “Deportees” in the Famous Woody Guthrie Song

Los Gatos DC-3 crash
Airliner accidents and incidents in California
Aviation accidents and incidents in the United States in 1948
Los Gatos DC-3 crash
Accidents and incidents involving the Douglas C-47 Skytrain
History of Fresno County, California